Ilongo may refer to:
 Ilongo people, an ethnic group of Mindanao and the Visayas, the Philippines
 Ilongo language, their Austronesian language
 Ilongo Ngasanya, Congolese football player

See also 
 Ilongot (disambiguation)
 Llongo, a village in Albania

Language and nationality disambiguation pages